Aulon is a commune in the Creuse department in the Nouvelle-Aquitaine region in central France.

Geography 

Population

Sights 
 The church, dating from the fifteenth century.

See also
 Communes of the Creuse department

References 

Communes of Creuse